Valerie Wohlfeld, (b. 1956  in Sacramento, California) is an American poet.

Life
She was educated at American University, and Sarah Lawrence College, and received an M.F.A. from Vermont College in 1983.  Valerie Wohlfeld's 1994 collection, Thinking the World Visible, won the Yale Younger Poets Prize. Her book, Woman with Wing Removed, came out in 2010 from Truman State University Press. Her work has appeared in The Antioch Review, New England Review, Journal of the American Medical Association, and elsewhere.

Works
 The Uccello, The New Yorker, May 8, 1988
 Nautilus; Beeyard, The Antioch Review, Volume 58 Number 1, Winter 2000
 Dove; Rib; Fire and Flux, Prairie Schooner, Volume 77, Number 3, Fall 2003
 The Sugar Tooth, AGNI, Boston University, Volume 37, 1993
 Trinkets, AGNI, Boston University, Volume 34, 1991
 Vessel, The New Criterion, November 2002
 The Cut Hair of Nuns, The Antioch Review, Volume 61 Number 2, Spring 2003
 Apple, The Seneca Review, Vol. 33 Issue 2, Fall 2003
 Fruit for the Fall, The Antioch Review, Volume 63 Number 3, Summer 2005
 Poppies, Ploughshares, Spring 2007 
 HEART: SPECIMEN, VALPARAISO POETRY REVIEW, Spring/Summer 2007 
 Bejeweled; Lot’s Daughters, Prairie Schooner, Volume 82, Number 1, Spring 2008
 Wind, The Antioch Review, Volume 66 Number 1, Winter 2008
 Vertigo, JAMA, 2008;299(8):878

Books
 Thinking the World Visible, Yale University Press, 1994, 
 Woman with Wing Removed, Truman State University Press, 2010,

Anthologies
 
 Poets of the New Century Editors Roger Weingarten and Richard M. Higgerson, David R. Godine, Publisher, Inc., 2001, 
 The Yale Younger Poets Anthology Editor George Bradley, Yale University Press, 1998,

References

Living people
Sarah Lawrence College alumni
Vermont College of Fine Arts alumni
American University alumni
1956 births
American women poets
21st-century American women